Henblas Burial Chamber is a Neolithic dolmen located in Henblas, to the southwest of Llangristiolus, Anglesey, Wales.

Description
The structure consists of a pair of large quartz rich boulders, measuring about 4.1 metres and 3 metres in height with circumferences of 15.3 metres and 16.8 metres respectively, with a large slab lying between them, measuring 5.5 metres by 4.7 metres, which has been interpreted as being the former capstone. The boulders appear to be in their original positions.

The capstone appears to have scratch marks on them, which do not match the direction of the known ice flows in the area, indicating that there has been some human interference.

References

Prehistoric sites in Anglesey
Dolmens in Wales
Scheduled monuments in Anglesey
Llangristiolus
Tumuli in Wales